Pebbles (Tamil: Koozhangal) is a 2021 Indian Tamil-language drama film directed by debutant P. S. Vinothraj. The film was produced by Vignesh Shivan and Nayanthara under the Rowdy Pictures banner. Featuring music composed by Yuvan Shankar Raja, the film had cinematography handled by Jeya Parthipan and Vignesh Kumulai and was edited by Ganesh Siva.

Pebbles was screened at the 50th International Film Festival Rotterdam held in Netherlands on 4 February 2021, where it received the Tiger Award at the festival. It was selected as the Indian entry for the Best International Feature Film at the 94th Academy Awards, but was not nominated. and will also be screened at 52nd International Film Festival of India in 'Indian Panorama' section, feature film category.

About the film 
The story is of the film based on a real incident of director Vinothraj's family which inspired him to direct the film. Vinoth stated that he spent a lot of time looking for an arid landscape, which was required for the story and was finally found in Arittapati, near Melur in Madurai. The whole film was shot at Arittapati in 30 days. The mountains in the 13 villages where the film was shot are thousands of years old and the villages which Vinoth explored, as a part of the story, too developed on its own. The biggest challenge of shooting the film is mostly the humid weather, for which he stated that "As sunlight was crucial for the story, we would start shooting every day after 10am and wind up by 3pm. We would watch the rushes in the evening and that would give us the motivation for the next day."

Cast 
 Chellapandi as Velu
 Karuththadaiyaan as Ganapathy

Reception 

S. Srivatsan of The Hindu wrote in his review stating "There has never been a Tamil film that has captured the vastness of rural life in a more austere, art-house fashion. PS Vinothraj knows what are all the basics of filmmaking that is lacking, even in the works of celebrated filmmakers." Baradwaj Rangan of Film Companion South wrote "Despite the many tragedies in the scenario (both natural and man-made), the film doesn’t beg for our sympathies. Only at the very end do we feel a twinge."

Accolades

Awards

Pebbles was premiered at the 50th International Film Festival Rotterdam held in Netherlands on 4 February 2021. The film was officially selected at the North American premiere of New Directors New Films Festival which held on 28 April to 8 May, and also selected at the Jeonju International Film Festival held in South Korea from 29 April to 8 May. The film was also screened at the Indian Film Festival of Los Angeles held on 20 to 27 May, and at the Kyiv Molodist International Film Festival held from 29 May to 6 June. Pebbles is India's official entry to Oscars 2022. 14 films were shortlisted for this year's India's official entry to the Oscars 2022. Among the 14 films were Nayattu, Mandela, and Sardar Udham. Shaji N Karun, the chairperson of the 15-member selection committee watched the 14 films in Kolkata. Reportedly, the decision to select Pebbles for the Oscars 2022 was unanimous. However, the film was not nominated for the award.

See also
 List of submissions to the 94th Academy Awards for Best International Feature Film
 List of Indian submissions for the Academy Award for Best International Feature Film

References

External links 
 

2021 films
2021 drama films
2021 independent films
Indian independent films
2020s Tamil-language films